Helicranon or Helikranon was an ancient Greek city located in the region of Epirus. The site of the city is tentatively located near modern Chrysorrachi.

See also
List of cities in ancient Epirus

References

Sources

Populated places in ancient Epirus
Cities in ancient Epirus
Former populated places in Greece